Giuseppe Graziosi (Savignano sul Panaro, January 25, 1879 - Florence, July 2, 1942) was an Italian sculptor, painter and graphic designer.

His work was used as reference by many Modenese artists working throughout the first half of the twentieth century. Despite his long stays in Florence and Milan, Graziosi continued to actively participate in cultural events through his participation in local exhibitions and in the main artistic circles such as the Accademia del Fiasco and the Associazione degli Artisti e della Stampa in Modena.

Biography 

Giuseppe Graziosi was born on January 25, 1879, in Savignano sul Panaro (Modena) to Pietro Graziosi and Angela Marchi, sharecroppers of the Mombrina estate owned by Arsenio Crespellani, mayor of the small town and a well-known archaeologist. Having recognized the talents of the young man, Crespellani and his wife Emilia financed his training in Modena, Florence, Rome and Paris.

Graziosi died in Florence on July 2, 1942. On September 30 he was commemorated in Maranello (Modena) by friends, colleagues and authorities including Ardengo Soffici, Felice Carena, who pronounced the eulogy, Baccio Maria Bacci, Francesco Messina, Luciano Minguzzi and Italo Griselli.

Artistic education in Modena 
From 1892 to 1898 he completed his first artistic apprenticeship at the Royal Institute of Fine Arts in Modena where he attended the special course of sculpture under the guidance of Giuseppe Gibellini, inspired by Neapolitan sculpture produced by Achille D'Orsi, Filippo Cifariello and Vincenzo Gemito. Examples are works such as La cicca (Modena, private collection), the portraits of Mr. and Mrs. Crespellani and The Saint John the Baptist, awarded a prize at the exhibition of the Society of Encouragement of Modena in 1897.

In 1898 he finished his last year of apprenticeship with the statue from life, Il figlio della gleba (The son of the serfs), which was presented and praised at the National Exhibition of Turin. Starting from this year Graziosi competes three times (1898, 1902-1903 and 1907) in the tests for the Competition of the National Artistic Pension in Rome, without any success.

Florence 

He attended the Free School of Nude under the guidance of the sculptor Augusto Rivalta. At that time Giovanni Fattori taught painting in the women's section and his studio probably became a place of pilgrimage for Graziosi and his companions. Among these is Ardengo Soffici.

It was his frequentation of the Pignone Foundry in Florence that gave him the idea for the statue The Foundryman (Modena, Gipsoteca "Giuseppe Graziosi"), made in 1899 in Modena and presented at the Universal Exhibition in Paris in 1900 where Graziosi was awarded a bronze medal. Meanwhile, obtains the qualification for the teaching of drawing in technical schools and normal.

Rome 
From 1900 to 1901 he served in the military in Rome in the barracks of Traspontina as an attache at first to the Photographic Section of Monte Mario, and then to the restoration of Castel Sant'Angelo. Among the comrades tighten friendship with the painter Ezio Castellucci. At the end of military service, in 1902 will follow a period of improvement in Rome, where he attended the Free School of Nude at the Academy of Fine Arts.

Paris 
In 1903 Graziosi stays in Paris with his friend Ardengo Soffici. In the city he works for a German client and collaborates with the sculptor Salesio Lugli from Carpi, a fellow student at the Institute of Fine Arts in Modena.

Giovane Etruria 

Graziosi, who in 1904 had resumed lessons at the Free School of Nude, won the competition "Baruzzi" of Bologna for two editions: in 1904 with the sculpture All work and in 1908 with the painting Malocchio.

In 1906 he joined the group "Giovane Etruria" promoted by Plinio Nomellini and Galileo Chini. He married on February 5 Bianca Coduri, whom he had met at the Academy of Florence, and from which he will have two children, Paul and Rosetta. With the group he participates in major exhibitions: in 1906 at the National Exhibition in Milan and in 1914 at the Exhibition of the Roman Secession.

Classical art 

These were years of intense activity that saw him involved in the international competition for the sketches of the monument to Don Bosco to be erected in Turin (1913), in the creation of a funerary monument for the Monumental Cemetery of Rosario (Santa Fe), and in important exhibitions dedicated to graphics, among which is the exhibition of Italian etchers held in London in 1916.

From May 24, 1915, to the end of 1918 Graziosi enlisted in the army during the First World War and served, as a draftsman, at the Directorate of the III Regiment Genio-Specialist Photographers.

1920s 

In 1924 he bought a house in Liguria, in Sanremo. The variety of the Ligurian landscape inspired the artist to draw several paintings and graphics. In 1929 at the Littoriale in Bologna he inaugurated the equestrian monument to Mussolini.

1930s & 1940s 
The artist continued to take part in exhibitions such as the Quadrennial of Rome (1931, 1935 and 1939) and the first National Exhibition of Sports Art organized in 1936 by the Italian National Olympic Committee at the Palazzo delle Esposizioni in Rome. Between 1931 and 1938 he realizes the fountains of Modena among which we remember the Fountain of the two rivers and the one of the covered market of via Albinelli.

In 1936 he was appointed Knight of the Order of the Crown of Italy and bought the Castle of Maranello where he set up his summer residence and set up the study in the church annex also moving the gallery of plaster casts.

Expositions and Academics 

To the artist are dedicated important personal exhibitions: in 1918 in Florence, in Palazzo Antinori; in 1919 to the Gallery Pesaro of Milan, in 1940 to the XXII International Exposition of Venice and in 1941 to the Gallery of the Million in Milan, the first one, this, of alone designs. As a professor of sculpture teaches at the Academies of Fine Arts in Milan, Naples and Florence.

Critique 
The exhibition held in 1963 in Palazzo Strozzi in Florence and the in-depth study on the artist carried out by Gabriella Guandalini in the first catalog dedicated to the Gipsoteca Graziosi of the Civic Museum of Modena,Guandalini 1984</ref> recently updated, and the interventions of Francesca Petrucci that clarify his position in the broader context of the national and international figurative situation will be decisive for the critical story of Graziosi.

Gipsoteca "Giuseppe Graziosi" 

The gallery of plaster casts was founded in Modena in 1984 following the donation by the heirs of a large collection of plastic, pictorial and graphic works by the artist Giuseppe Graziosi. After an initial location at the Istituto San Paolo, in 1994 the Gipsoteca was set up on the ground floor of Palazzo dei Musei.

Photographic archive 

The photographic archive donated by Graziosi's heirs in 1999 consists of 2144 images taken by the artist on different supports: negative and positive stereoscopic plates, negatives on glass plates and gelatin on nitrate film.

Honors

See also 

 Paolo Graziosi (archeologist)
 Giuseppe Mozzanica
 Ardengo Soffici
 Augusto Rivalta
 Museo Civico di Modena

References

Bibliography 

 Emanuela Andreoli, GRAZIOSI, Giuseppe, in Dizionario biografico degli italiani, vol. 59, Roma, Istituto dell'Enciclopedia Italiana, 2002. URL consultato il 16 dicembre 2015.

External links 
 
 
 
 
 
 

1942 deaths
1879 births
Italian graphic designers
20th-century Italian painters
20th-century Italian sculptors